Neve Shalom (lit. Dwelling place of peace) is an historic neighborhood in Tel Aviv, Israel. It was established in 1890 outside the walls of Jaffa and named after : "My people will live in a dwelling place of peace."

History
Neve Shalom was the second Jewish neighborhood built outside Jaffa in the 19th century, after Neve Tzedek. It was located to the east of Manshiya. The neighborhood  was built in the same style as Neve Tzedek: low-rise buildings with red tiled roofs and decorative arched windows. The streets were narrow, with no clear separation between residential and industrial areas.

One of the first public institutions, built in 1895, was Sha'arei Torah (lit. 'Gates of the Torah'), the beit midrash of Rabbi Abraham Isaac Kook, which included a synagogue, a primary school, a high school and craft workshops. In addition to religious studies, the students learned carpentry and metalwork.

In 1905, Rabbi Kook's brother-in-law, Raphael Rabinowitz-Teomim, established a girls' school that became an important center of Hebrew culture and language-learning. In the wake of financial hardship and serious damage in 1948, the site was abandoned.  
 
In the early 1990s Neve Shalom was saved from demolition by proactive preservation activists.

References

Neighborhoods of Tel Aviv
History of Tel Aviv
1890s establishments in Ottoman Syria